Krasny Kut is the name of several inhabited localities in Russia.

Urban localities
Krasny Kut, Saratov Oblast, a town in Krasnokutsky District of Saratov Oblast

Rural localities
Krasny Kut, Krasnodar Krai, a khutor in Krasnokutsky Rural Okrug of Mostovsky District of Krasnodar Krai
Krasny Kut, Kursk Oblast, a khutor in Panikinsky Selsoviet of Medvensky District of Kursk Oblast
Krasny Kut, Novosibirsk Oblast, a village in Kupinsky District of Novosibirsk Oblast
Krasny Kut, Primorsky Krai, a selo in Spassky District of Primorsky Krai
Krasny Kut, Oktyabrsky District, Rostov Oblast, a khutor in Krasnokutskoye Rural Settlement of Oktyabrsky District of Rostov Oblast
Krasny Kut, Vesyolovsky District, Rostov Oblast, a khutor in Pozdneyevskoye Rural Settlement of Vesyolovsky District of Rostov Oblast